Styphlolepis hypermegas is a moth in the family Crambidae. It was described by Turner in 1922. It is found in Australia, where it has been recorded from New South Wales and Queensland.

References

Moths described in 1922
Midilinae